Ottawa Township is one of the fifteen townships of Putnam County, Ohio, United States.  The 2000 census found 7,961 people in the township, 2,675 of whom lived in the unincorporated portions of the township.

Geography
Located in the central part of the county, it borders the following townships:
Liberty Township - north
Van Buren Township - northeast corner
Blanchard Township - east
Riley Township - southeast corner
Pleasant Township - south
Union Township - southwest
Greensburg Township - west
Palmer Township - northwest corner

Two villages are located in central Ottawa Township: Ottawa, the largest village in and county seat of Putnam County; and Glandorf, which lies northwest of Ottawa.

Name and history
Ottawa Township was established in 1835. Named for the Ottawa Indians, it is the only Ottawa Township statewide.

Government
The township is governed by a three-member board of trustees, who are elected in November of odd-numbered years to a four-year term beginning on the following January 1. Two are elected in the year after the presidential election and one is elected in the year before it. There is also an elected township fiscal officer, who serves a four-year term beginning on April 1 of the year after the election, which is held in November of the year before the presidential election. Vacancies in the fiscal officership or on the board of trustees are filled by the remaining trustees.

References

External links
County website

Townships in Putnam County, Ohio
Townships in Ohio